Scyllarus pygmaeus is a species of slipper lobster that lives in shallow water in the Mediterranean Sea and eastern Atlantic Ocean. The juvenile form was first described in 1885, with the description of the adult following in 1888 as a result of the Challenger expedition.

Description
Its small size precludes S. pygmaeus from being a target for fisheries. The body of S. pygmaeus is "pale brownish or pinkish with patches of darker hairs".

S. pygmaeus resembles a young individual of Scyllarus arctus, with which it occurs in sympatry. The two species can be distinguished by a suite of characteristics:
The anterior part of the abdominal tergites has a groove lined with hairs in S. pygmaeus, but not in S. arctus.
S. arctus has a forward-pointing, pointed tip to the second abdominal sternites, while in S. pygmaeus, it is rounded and points backwards.
S. pygmaeus has a conical tubercle on the fifth thoracic somite, while the tubercle is compressed rather than conical in S. arctus.
The sculptured posterior part of the first abdominal somite is wider in the centre than at the edges in S. pygmaeus, while in S. arctus, it is an even width throughout.

Distribution and ecology
S. pygmaeus has a wide distribution in the Mediterranean Sea and islands in the eastern Atlantic Ocean, including Madeira, the Canary Islands, and the Cape Verde Islands. It has not been observed off the coast of North Africa further east than Morocco. Females carry eggs in June and August.

Taxonomic history

S. pygmaeus was first described in 1888 by Charles Spence Bate as part of the results of the Challenger expedition. He based his description of "Arctus pygmaeus" on material from "off Gomera" in the Canary Islands. In the same publication, he also described "Arctus immaturus" from the Cape Verde archipelago, which Eugène Louis Bouvier realised in 1915 was simply the "nisto" (juvenile) stage of S. pygmaeus. Applying the principle of first reviser, Bouvier established that S. pygmaeus would be the valid name, over S. immaturus. Although S. pygmaeus is not rare in the Mediterranean Sea, its presence there was overlooked for decades, due to the confusion between it and the more conspicuous S. arctus, whose immature form S. pygmaeus was often assumed to be.

The juvenile "nisto" form of S. pygmaeus was named earlier than the adult form; Sarado described it in 1885 under the name Nisto laevis in his 1885 work  ("Study of the crustaceans of Nice").

The English vernacular name preferred by the Food and Agriculture Organization is pygmy locust lobster, alongside the French  and the Spanish .

References

Achelata
Crustaceans of the Atlantic Ocean
Crustaceans described in 1888